Ahmed Nasser (born 18 October 1953) is an Egyptian modern pentathlete. He competed at the 1984 Summer Olympics, finishing in 39th place in the individual event.

References

External links
 

1953 births
Living people
Egyptian male modern pentathletes
Olympic modern pentathletes of Egypt
Modern pentathletes at the 1984 Summer Olympics